Mauricio Castillo Contreras (born 19 June 1987) is a Costa Rican international footballer who plays professionally for La U Universitarios, as a midfielder.

Club career
Castillo has played for Saprissa, Belén, Cartaginés and Qingdao Jonoon.

In January 2015, Castillo rejoined Cartaginés.

International career
Castillo made his debut for Costa Rica in 2012. He has represented his country in FIFA World Cup qualification matches, and played at the 2013 CONCACAF Gold Cup.

References

1987 births
Living people
Footballers from San José, Costa Rica
Association football midfielders
Costa Rican footballers
Costa Rica international footballers
Deportivo Saprissa players
Belén F.C. players
C.S. Cartaginés players
Qingdao Hainiu F.C. (1990) players
Municipal Grecia players
Liga FPD players
China League One players
Costa Rican expatriate footballers
Expatriate footballers in China
Costa Rican expatriate sportspeople in China
Expatriate footballers in Guatemala
Costa Rican expatriate sportspeople in Guatemala
2013 CONCACAF Gold Cup players
C.F. Universidad de Costa Rica footballers